Itinga is a Brazilian municipality located in the northeast of the state of Minas Gerais.  the population was 15,022 in a total area of 1,641 km².

The city belongs to the mesoregion of Jequitinhonha and to the microregion of Araçuaí.  The elevation of the municipal seat is 269 meters. It became a municipality in 1943.  This municipality is located 33 kilometers to the west of the important BR-116 highway. It is connected by paved road. The Jequitinhonha River flows through the town. Most of the town is on the left bank of the river, but the two sides are connected by a bridge. The closest population center with a hospital and banking facilities is Araçuaí, a distance of about 47 km.

The main economic activities are cattle raising and farming. The GDP was R$36,999,000 (2005). There were no banking agencies in 2006. In the rural area there were 1,403 farms with around 3,800 people involved in the agricultural sector. There were 23 tractors, a ratio of one tractor for every 70 farms. The main crops were coconuts, coffee, sugarcane, beans, manioc, and corn.

In the health sector there were 4 health clinics. The score on the Municipal Human Development Index was 0.623. This ranked Itinga 799 out of 853 municipalities in the state, with Poços de Caldas in first place with 0.841 and Setubinha in last place with 0.568. See Frigoletto for the complete list. 
Degree of urbanization: 41.30% (All data are from 2000)
Illiteracy rate: 31.02% (13.63% for the country)
Infant mortality rate: 8.13 (the national rate was 18.91.)
Percentage of urban area connected to sewage system: 45.30%
Life expectancy at birth: 66.8

See also
List of municipalities in Minas Gerais

References

Statistics from IBGE
Indicadores Minas—info on health

Municipalities in Minas Gerais